Eastern Shore Centre is a  lifestyle center located at the intersection of Malbis Parkway (Alabama State Route 181) and Interstate 10 in Spanish Fort, Alabama, United States, a suburb of Mobile. A landscaped perimeter road, Eastern Shore Boulevard, connects the lifestyle and power center components of this hybrid regional center. An apartment community, The Arlington at Eastern Shore Centre, was developed in the northeastern section of the complex. Eastern Shore Centre is Baldwin County's first large-scale, multi-anchored regional shopping center and the first lifestyle center to open in South Alabama.

Developed by The MGHerring Group and designed by CMH Architects of Birmingham, it officially opened on November 17, 2004, following a slight delay caused by Hurricane Ivan, although the Dillard's department store was operating a few weeks earlier. The lifestyle center is anchored by the Dillard's and Belk department stores, while the bookstore Barnes & Noble and the regional footwear retailer Shoe Station are additional junior anchors. In-line merchants include Build-A-Bear Workshop, Ann Taylor LOFT, and Kirkland's Home. Numerous eateries and service-oriented businesses are situated on outparcels in the parking lots of both Eastern Shore Centre and Eastern Shore Plaza. As of spring 2017, the regional shopping center is managed by Spinoso Real Estate Group.

Eastern Shore Centre added an entertainment anchor, in the form of a fourteen screen stadium seat Premiere Cinemas multiplex. This  facility features more than 2,500 seats and is Alabama's first all-digital theater complex.

This retailer is located in the Belk anchored wing of the lifestyle center.

In April 2015, Bed Bath & Beyond closed and relocated to the Jubilee Square power center in nearby Daphne. Regional shoe retailer Shoe Station relocated from an outparcel at Eastern Shore Plaza into a redeveloped 23,130 square foot combination of the former Bed Bath & Beyond and adjoining mall space in the fall of 2015.

In January 2017, home furnishings retailers Williams-Sonoma and Pottery Barn relocated to the Legacy Village at Spring Hill shopping center in West Mobile.

As it is a regional shopping center, Eastern Shore Centre also includes a smaller power center component located on site, adjacent to the lifestyle center.

Phase five of development comprised the construction of a  Publix supermarket and adjoining community-oriented strip mall on a  site north of the Belk department store building. Publix supermarket opened as the anchor of the Eastern Shore Commons shopping center on November 19, 2011.

References

External links 
Eastern Shore Centre - Official Site
Square Footage Information for Eastern Shore Centre & Plaza
Article about Eastern Shore Centre in Shopping Centers Today
Article interviewing Security about Shopping during the holiday season

Shopping malls in Alabama
Shopping malls established in 2004
Buildings and structures in Baldwin County, Alabama
Tourist attractions in Baldwin County, Alabama